Figure skating at the 2013 Winter Universiade included a ladies' event for senior level skaters. The short program was held on December 14 and the free skating on December 15, 2013.

Results

Panel of Judges

References

Figure skating at the 2013 Winter Universiade
Univ